Urumpirai is a town in Northern Jaffna District, Sri Lanka.

 Urumpirai Temple
 Katpahapillaiyar Temple

See also
Sivakumaran
Anbujan
Vannan
C. Nagalingam - acting Governor-General (1954), acting Chief Justice (1954), Attorney General (1946–1947)

References 

Towns in Jaffna District
Valikamam East DS Division
Suburbs of Jaffna